Hugh Adam ( – ) was an investor in, and director of, Rangers F.C., working closely with Willie Waddell. He ran the Rangers Pools and later the Rangers Lottery.

His surname is often misspelled as "Adams".

Career
Adam started his involvement with Rangers as a key investor in the Rangers Pools, a pool betting syndicate. He had little knowledge of football but was a good bookmaker. In the United Kingdom, gambling laws are strict but the government has no monopoly on betting, and anything freely traded is allowed under the common law.

1971
The 1971 Ibrox disaster was a crowd crush that led to 66 dead and over 200 severely injured. Adam took charge of the club to ensure that such would never happen again. Unfortunately, a similar disaster occurred many years later in the Hillsborough disaster, and in its aftermath the Taylor Report led to all-seater stadiums in the top tiers of UK soccer.

1990s
Adam predicted that Rangers would suffer in the 1990s, but he continued to invest in the club until his death.

1998

Sir David Murray bought out the club in 1998 and after that Adam had no financial interest in it. Adam disagreed vigorously with Murray about how the club should be organised.

See also
History of Rangers F.C.

Notes

References

1925 births
2012 deaths
Bookmakers
People from Hamilton, South Lanarkshire
Rangers F.C. non-playing staff
Directors of football clubs in Scotland
20th-century Scottish businesspeople